The Fallen Angel is a 2012 spy novel by Daniel Silva. It is the twelfth in Gabriel Allon series.

Plot
Unlike recent titles in the series, this book is set primarily in Italy as Allon helps the Pope's private secretary, Monsignor Luigi Donati with a case that is troubling The Vatican.  The conclusion takes place in Jerusalem.

Reception
It was longlisted for the 2013 IMPAC award, and like others in Silva's Allon series, The Fallen Angel  was a New York Times bestseller rising to #1 on the hardcover fiction list in August 2012. Zarine Khan was considered for Chimera, a planned movie adaptation of the book, however it did not proceed.

References

External links

Novels by Daniel Silva
HarperCollins books
2012 American novels
Novels set in Italy